Der Wanderer über dem Nebelmeer is a compilation album released in 2010 by Pest Productions. The album featured appearances by notable artists including Agalloch and Kauan. It included metal and non-metal songs, all of which were exclusive to this release. The album cover and name derived from an 1818 oil painting with the same name, created by German artist Caspar David Friedrich. The album was limited to 1,000 copies.

Track listing

Personnel
 Caspar David Friedrich – artwork
 Niels Geybels – concept, compiling
 Loïc Cellier – mastering
 Depraved Designs – layout, design

References

External links
Der Wanderer über dem Nebelmeer (V.A. Compilation) at Myspace
Pest Productions
Midnight Records

Heavy metal compilation albums
2010 compilation albums